Mary Bateson (12 September 1865, Robin Hood's Bay – 30 November 1906, Cambridge) was a British historian and suffrage activist.

Life
Bateson was the daughter of William Henry Bateson, Master of St John's College, Cambridge, and Anna Aikin. The geneticist William Bateson was her older brother, Margaret Heitland was her sister. She was educated at the Perse School for Girls and Newnham College, Cambridge. She spent her entire professional life at Newnham, teaching there from 1888 and becoming a Fellow in 1903. Known for her writings in medieval history, she was supported professionally by historians Mandell Creighton and F. W. Maitland. She died of a brain haemorrhage and is buried in Histon Road Cemetery, Cambridge.

Activism 
As part of her suffrage activities, Bateson became the Cambridge organiser for the Central Society for Women's Suffrage in 1888. The following year she was elected to the executive committee Cambridge Women's Suffrage Association. In 1906 she participated in a deputation to Parliament where she presented Prime Minister Henry Campbell-Bannerman with a petition on behalf of ‘women who are doctors of letters, science and law in the universities of the United Kingdom and of the British colonies, in the universities also of Europe and the United States’. The petition declared that the signatories ‘believe the disenfranchisement of one sex to be injurious to both, and a national wrong in a country which pretends to be governed on a representative system’.

Works

Register of Crabhouse Nunnery, 1889
Origin and History of Double Monasteries, 1899
Records of the borough of Leicester; being a series of extracts from the archives of the Corporation of Leicester, 3 vols, 1899–1901
Mediaeval England, 1066–1350, 1903
'The French in America (1608—1744)', chapter 3 of Cambridge Modern History, vol. 7 (1903)

References

External links
Mary Bateson Papers at the University of Manchester Library.

19th-century English historians
1865 births
1906 deaths
People educated at the Perse School for Girls
Fellows of Newnham College, Cambridge
Bateson family
20th-century English historians
English suffragists
Contributors to the Victoria County History